Miguel de Cervantes was the author of Don Quixote.

Cervantes may also refer to:

Astronomy
Cervantes (crater), a crater on Mercury
Mu Arae, a star in the constellation Ara, officially designated Cervantes by the International Astronomical Union in 2015

Media
 Cervantes (film), a 1967 film by Vincent Sherman
 Cervantes, a character in "The New Guy", an episode of The Shield
 Cervantes de Leon, A pirate based character in the Soul Calibur fighting game franchise

People with the surname
Alfonso J. Cervantes (1920–1983), mayor of St. Louis, Missouri
Antonio Cervantes (born 1945), Colombian boxer
Elizabeth Cervantes (born 1973), Mexican actress
Francisco Cervantes de Salazar (1514?–1575), Spanish man of letters
Ignacio Cervantes (1847-1905), Cuban composer
Jorge Cervantes (born 1953), American horticulturist
Julio Cervantes, American soccer player; see Oakland Roots SC
Lorna Dee Cervantes (born 1954), Chicana poet and activist
Miguel Cervantes (actor) (born 1977), American actor, singer and activist
Vicente Cervantes (1755–1829), Mexican botanist

Places
Cervantes, Río Negro, a municipality in Río Negro, Argentina
Cervantes, Western Australia
Cervantes, Ilocos Sur, a municipality in the Philippines
Cervantes, Lugo, a municipality in Galicia, Spain

Other uses
Casa de Cervantes, a museum in Valladolid, Spain
Instituto Cervantes, a public institution created by the Spanish government
Cervantes, an updated version of Cymbeline radar

Spanish-language surnames
Surnames of Spanish origin